is a hydrofoil ferry service that travels between Fukuoka, Japan and Busan, South Korea. It is operated by JR Kyushu Jet Ferry, a division of Kyushu Railway Company.

Although journey times are longer, ferry travel is generally much cheaper than flying, with direct connections available between several major Japanese port cities and China, Korea and Russia.

Ferry schedules are subject to seasonal changes and may vary according to the weather.

Amenities 

Beetle Ferries provide two seating areas and a duty-free shop.

Travel Information

Checking in

Departure processing starts 2.5 hours before departure and ends 1 hour before departure. Passengers must fill out a boarding pass before travelling.

Arrival/Departure Cards

Arrival cards required to enter Japan are available on the ferry. They can be filled out at the same time as the Korean departure card.

The departure card (from Korea) must be filled out in Korean, while the arrival card for entry into Japan must be written either in kanji or English.

Customs Declaration

Travelers carrying expensive merchandise or valuables (cameras, watches, jewelry, fur products) are required to declare the item, quantity and price on the customs form. The document must be retained for the return trip.

See also
 Kobee - A South Korean ferry line operated by Miraejet between Busan and Fukuoka

External links
  (Japanese)

Ferry companies of Japan
Kyushu Railway Company